Mordellistena klapperichi is a beetle in the genus Mordellistena of the family Mordellidae. It was described in 1956 by Ermisch.

References

klapperichi
Beetles described in 1956